Aioun el Atrouss Airport  is an airport located in Aioun el Atrouss (also known as Ayoun al Atrous), a town in southern Mauritania, which is the capital of the Hodh El Gharbi region.

References

External links

Airports in Mauritania
Hodh El Gharbi Region